Sels is a Belgian surname that may refer to
 (1846–1923), Dutch army officer and politician 
Edward Sels (born 1941), Belgian racing cyclist
Jack Sels (1922–1970), Belgian jazz saxophonist, arranger and composer
Luc Sels (born 1967), Belgian sociologist
Matz Sels (born 1992), Belgian football player
Maurits van Löben Sels (1876–1944), Dutch fencer
Rosa Sels (born 1943), Belgian racing cyclist, sister of Edward

See also
Schaal Sels-Merksem, one-day road bicycle race held in September in Belgium in honor of Jacques-Charles Sels

Dutch-language surnames